State Road 22, commonly known as Ibar Highway, is an IB-class road, connecting Belgrade with Šumadija and Western Serbia and finally with Montenegro at Špiljani border crossing.

It starts with Orlovača interchange in Belgrade's municipality of Čukarica and is going through several major municipalities such as Ljig, Gornji Milanovac, Preljina (town in the municipality of Čačak), Kraljevo and Novi Pazar. In the southern section, highway goes in parallel to the upper course of the river Ibar, hence the name.

Before the new road categorization regulation given in 2013, the route wore the following names: M 22 and M 2 (before 2012) / A2, A4, 15 and 32 (after 2012).

The road is a part of the following European routes: E65 and E80 (Bregovi – Mehov Krš), E761 (Preljina – Kraljevo) and E763 (Belgrade – Preljina).

Motorway alternative

In order to provide the safer and faster traffic link of Belgrade with Western Serbia and Montenegrin coast, and to alleviate the dangers of the Ibar Highway, the new A2 motorway is under construction from Čačak to border with Montenegro. The section from Belgrade bypass to Čačak was completed in 2019, and since then the traffic over the highway on section from Belgrade to Čačak was significantly reduced.

Accident statistics
A single-lane carriageway, it bears heavy car and truck traffic between major cities of Belgrade, Čačak, Kraljevo and Novi Pazar, as well as transit traffic towards Montenegro, and occasional agricultural machinery is not unseen. If features long stretches of straight road interrupted by dangerous curves. Speeding, DUI and other traffic offences are major causes of accidents, most of them occurring during the night.

In three-year span from 2017 to 2019, a total of 1,736 traffic accidents happened on its route, with 86 deaths and 1,619 injured people.

Before the completion of motorway on section from Belgrade to Čačak, with more than 18,000 vehicles passing the highway daily (as of 2016), it was one of the most frequent roads in Serbia. Often called the "black highway", it is considered the most dangerous road in Serbia, averaging several hundreds traffic accidents annually.

Sections

See also
 Roads in Serbia
 European route E65
 European route E80
 European route E761
 European route E763

References

External links
 Official website – Roads of Serbia (Putevi Srbije)
 Official website – Corridors of Serbia (Koridori Srbije) (Serbian)
 Map of Serbian main and regional roads

State roads in Serbia